The Drama y Luz World Tour is the seventh concert tour by Mexican pop rock band Maná. The tour is in support of their eighth studio album Drama y Luz. The tour began with three concerts in Puerto Rico, following with dates in North America and Spain.

Background
On April 13, 2011 before the tour was announced, the band confirmed that they will be performing at the Rock in Rio Madrid festival in Madrid, Spain in 2012. The tour was then announced on April 18, 2011 on their Facebook page and their official website, with the first shows taking place in Puerto Rico. Due to overwhelming demand, more dates were announced for San Juan, Los Angeles, Houston and Rosemont. On May 6, 2011 on their Facebook page they confirmed the first two dates for the European tour, which is currently expected to visit Spain. This will be the first time the band begins a world tour in Puerto Rico. Maná will be performing their newest hits as well as songs from their previous albums.

Setlist

Off-tour appearances

Tour dates

Festivals and other miscellaneous performances
This show is part of Rock in Rio.
This show is part of H2O Music Festival.
This show is part of Rock in Rio Madrid.
This show is part of Latinoamericando Festival.
This show is part of Curaçao North Sea Jazz Festival.
This show is part of Viña del Mar International Song Festival.
This show is part of Tigo Fest

Tour personnel

Band
 Fher Olvera – main vocals, guitar, harmonics, and group member
 Alex González – drums, coros and group member
 Sergio Vallín – acoustic & electric guitars and group member
 Juan Diego Calleros – bass and group member

Additional Band
 Juan Carlos Toribio – keyboards
 Fernando "Psycho" Vallín – backup guitar, coros
 Hector Quintana – percussions, coros

Management & Staff
 Personal Manager – Angelo Medina
 Personal Manager – Ulises Calleros
 Tour Manager – Fabian Serrano
 Production Manager – Roly Garbaloza
 Art Director – Luis Pastor
 Stage Manager – Francisco "Coco" Ayon
 Sound Engineer – Fernando Perez Claudin
 Video Engineer – Auturo Lopez Gorza
 Guitar Technician – Enrique Vallín
 Drum Technician – Julio Galindo Moreno
 G-Lec Video Led Screen Head – Alejandro Pasten
 Production Coordinator – Jorge Reyes

Award(s)
Los Premios 40 Principales 2011: Best Concert/Tour

References

External links
 Official site information of the tour
 

Maná concert tours
2011 concert tours
2012 concert tours
2013 concert tours
2014 concert tours
Concert tours of North America
Concert tours of South America